Keith Flaherty is director of Developmental Therapeutics at the Massachusetts General Hospital Cancer Center and associate professor of medicine at Harvard Medical School. He was previously a professor of medicine at the University of Pennsylvania.  He is known for his research on targeted therapies for cancer, and in particular for his work on the melanoma drug vemurafenib. In 2013, Massachusetts General Hospital partnered with AstraZeneca to partner Flaherty's research into developing a formula to identify vulnerabilities of tumors with AstraZeneca's library of drugs.

References

Year of birth missing (living people)
University of Pennsylvania faculty
American medical researchers
Living people
Harvard Medical School faculty
Cancer researchers
American oncologists